Estadio Bello Horizonte Rey Pelé is a football stadium located in Villavicencio, Colombia. The stadium, built in 1958, has a capacity of 15,000 people and was named after Manuel Calle Lombana, mayor of Villavicencio in 1958, thus receiving the nickname of Macal. Categoría Primera B club Llaneros play their home matches at this stadium.

History
On 4 January 2023, the Governor of Meta Department Juan Guillermo Zuluaga announced the renaming of the stadium to Estadio Bello Horizonte Rey Pelé, following a suggestion by FIFA President Gianni Infantino to all countries to name one stadium in tribute to Brazilian footballer Pelé, in the aftermath of his death on 29 December 2022.

References 

Football venues in Colombia
Sports venues completed in 1958